Taguatinga is an administrative region in the Federal District in Brazil.

History
By around 1749, near the Córrego Cortado, appeared a small settlement, formed by pioneers and drovers who sought to establish allotments in the Captaincy of Goiás, this was the first landing of the white man in the land of the future city of Taguatinga previously occupied by indigenous macro-Ge linguistic branch, as acroás, the xacriabás, the xavantes, the kayapos, the javaés, etc. However, some of these adventurers settled excited by the possibility of gold and diamonds, near the Cut. On the banks of the same stream was installed the farmhouse Taguatinga, owned by Gabriel da Cruz Miranda. In 1781, the farm Taguatinga was sold to Antonio Couto de Abreu, son of the Bandeirante and Urban Couto e Menezes.

The consolidation of the city took place much later, almost two centuries after this period, mainly generated by large populations attracted by the construction of Brasília.

With the transfer of the capital of Brazil into the country, many workers moved from all regions to build the new capital, however, decided to make his home there too. But how were poor, invaded land and built huts, revealing to a country establishing its rapid development in the reality of poverty in which they lived their population.

To contain the constant invasions on land near the capital, the city Taguatinga was created on June 5, 1958, on land which previously belonged to the Farm Taguatinga. Initially, the city was called "Villa Sarah Kubitschek" but then its name was changed to "Santa Cruz de Taguatinga", leaving only "Taguatinga". Often it is called by locals simply of "Taguá".

A few months after the first residents have moved to Taguatinga, already worked in local schools; hospitals; shops, etc. It was the beginning of settlement then the first satellite city of Brasília.

Taguatinga has developed especially in function of commerce and jobs that its population obtained. It became an important commercial center in the Federal District and pole of attraction for the population of nearby cities, harboring large shopping centers. Taguatinga today is one of the richest regions of the Federal District, today being is considered the economic capital of the Federal District.

Some cities that were formerly part of the administrative region of Taguatinga are: Ceilândia, Samambaia, Águas Claras and Vicente Pires.

The patron saint is Our Lady of Perpetual Help, which lithurgic celebration happens at June 27.

Etymology 
The suffix "-tinga" means "white" in Tupi. The prefix "ta'wa-", on the other hand, is quite controversial.

At first, "ta'wa" was translated as "bird", and "ta'wa'tinga" would mean "white bird". The Centro de Ensino Médio Ave Branca (CEMAB) has this name for this reason, and also for this reason a bird is part of the Taguatinga Flag, which was inspired by the poem Ta'Wa'Tiga by Antonio Garcia Muralha. Indeed, the scott hawk - predominantly white - is very common in the region, although there is no record of the animal being known as "Taguatinga".

But Taguá, a kind of yellowish or red clay, comes from the Tupi word "ta'wa" (which may also have originated the word "taba", indigenous house). Thus, "ta'wa" means "clay", and "ta'wa'tinga" would mean "white clay" a geological occurrence that is found in the region, especially near the Taguatinga Stream and the Cortado Stream.

Geography

Climate 
The climate of Taguatinga is tropical (Aw in the Koppen Classification), with a humid summer and a dry winter.

Economy 
The main commercial centers of the city are the Avenida Comercial (divided into North and South), Avenida Central and Avenida Hélio Prates, the Alameda Shopping and the so-called Pistão Sul, where the Taguatinga Shopping, hypermarkets, a fashion fair, a business center, several colleges, a soft drink factory, and numerous car dealers, among other establishments, are located.

A small industrial center (the QI) is located between Avenida Samdu Norte and Avenida Hélio Prates. There is another important industrial area near BR-060.

The region known as "Sector H Norte", near BR-070, concentrates a large variety of workshops and auto-parts stores. In the QNL sector, near Avenida Elmo Serejo, there is a small printing industry sector (SIGT).

The city was the 12th region with the most expensive launches in Brazil in 2012, according to the "Anuário do Mercado Imobiliário Brasileiro da Lopes", with eight developments, 1,192 units and 639 million reais in "Overall Sales Value". Comparatively, the DF was the fourth largest national market in 2012, with launches totaling a VGV of 3.3 billion reais.

See also
List of administrative regions of the Federal District

References

External links

 Regional Administration of Taguatinga website
 Government of the Federal District website

1958 establishments in Brazil
Administrative regions of Federal District (Brazil)
Populated places established in 1958